Colophon whitei is a species of beetle in family Lucanidae. It is endemic to South Africa.

It is on the 2006 IUCN Red List of Threatened Species.

References

External links

Lucaninae
Endemic beetles of South Africa
Beetles described in 1932
Taxonomy articles created by Polbot